Mahlstetten is a municipality in the district of Tuttlingen in Baden-Württemberg in Germany.

References

Tuttlingen (district)
Württemberg